Chen Hong; is an 8th-century Chinese imperial court painter who lived during the Tang Dynasty. His birth and death years are unknown.

Notes

References
Barnhart, R. M. et al. (1997). Three thousand years of Chinese painting. New Haven, Yale University Press. 

Tang dynasty painters
Year of death unknown
Court painters
Artists from Shaoxing
Painters from Zhejiang
Year of birth unknown
8th-century Chinese painters